American country music singer Blake Shelton has released 12 studio albums, four extended plays, five compilation albums, and 52 singles (including five as a featured artist). According to Recording Industry Association of America, Shelton has sold 52 million singles and 13 million albums in the United States. He also has achieved 14 No. 1 hits on Billboards Hot Country Songs chart. Billboard ranked him as the 31st Top Artist of the 2010s decade.

His debut single "Austin" was issued via Giant Records, but that label closed soon afterward and Warner Bros. Records Nashville assumed promotion of the single. All of Shelton's subsequent releases have also been on Warner Bros. Nashville, except for a temporary shift to Reprise Records Nashville in 2009 and 2010. "Austin" topped the Billboard Hot Country Songs charts in 2001, the first of twenty-eight singles in his career to achieve a number-one position on the country music charts. Included in these number-one singles is a consecutive streak of seventeen, lasting from "Hillbilly Bone" (a duet with Trace Adkins) in early 2010 to "Came Here to Forget" in 2016. Most of Shelton's singles have also entered the Billboard Hot 100, the highest being the number twelve peak of "Boys 'Round Here" (which features backing vocals from the Pistol Annies and multiple other artists). Shelton also has four featured credits which have charted, one of which was the multi-artist medley "Forever Country" in 2016, which reached number one on Hot Country Songs credited to the Artists of Then, Now, and Forever. Several non-single releases have charted, including multiple seasonal cuts from his 2012 Christmas release Cheers, It's Christmas, preview tracks from studio albums prior to their release, and duet performances with contestants on the television singing competition The Voice, on which Shelton is a judge.

Of Shelton's twelve studio albums, ten have achieved a certification from the Recording Industry Association of America (RIAA): Red River Blue (2011) and Based on a True Story... (2013) are his most commercially successful, having achieved double-platinum and triple-platinum certification for shipments of two million and three million in the United States, respectively. The 2010 compilation Loaded: The Best of Blake Shelton is also certified platinum for shipments of one million. Most of his singles also have RIAA certifications honoring a threshold number of certified downloads, with the highest being "Honey Bee", "God's Country", "God Gave Me You" (a cover of Dave Barnes), and "Boys 'Round Here", all of which have been certified multi-platinum for four million downloads and five million downloads, respectively.

Albums

Studio albums

Compilations

Extended plays

Singles

As lead artist

As featured artist

Promotional singles

Other charted songs

Videography

Video albums

Music videos

Notes

References

Shelton, Blake
 
 
Discographies of American artists